Major Martha Sandolo Belleh is a former Liberian government minister. Belleh was the Minister of Health and Social Security from 1981 to 1987 under coup leader Samuel Kanyon Doe. She graduated from Cuttington University in 1968 from the nursing division.

Sources

 Guide2WomenLeaders.com

Year of birth missing (living people)
Living people
Cuttington University alumni
Government ministers of Liberia
Women government ministers of Liberia
20th-century Liberian women politicians
20th-century Liberian politicians